This is a list of English poems over 1000 lines.  This list includes poems that are generally identified as part of the long poem genre, being considerable in length, and with that length enhancing the poems' meaning or thematic weight.  This alphabetical list is incomplete, as the label of long poem is selectively and inconsistently applied in literary academia.

References

 
Long